Tramps is a 2016 American romantic comedy film directed by Adam Leon and starring Callum Turner and Grace Van Patten. It was screened in the Contemporary World Cinema section at the 2016 Toronto International Film Festival. It was released on April 21, 2017, by Netflix.

Plot

Danny is a young Polish-American living in NYC who is asked by his recently jailed brother to deliver a briefcase with undisclosed contents and given vague instructions as to how. Ellie is being paid to be his driver so she can redo her life.
 
At the subway stop Danny leaves the briefcase with the wrong person, and takes the wrong bag. Realising too late as his subway car leaves the stop, he jumps off at the next to hightail it back. Neither woman with a green bag is there, so as he's leaving the platform in a panic, he sees Ellie.

Initially, Ellie tries to avoid Danny, but once she realises that no drop means neither will get paid, they work together to rectify it, She calls her contact, demanding she get equal pay, and organizing delivery for that night.

Danny and Ellie take a train to the suburbs, to an address on a prescription bottle. As they go, he tries to chat. He tells her he's a cook working in the city, but would like to relocate. She's from Philly, and she last was a cocktail waitress in a strip club.

Arriving at the address, someone nonchalantly lets them in and they wander through, looking for the woman from the subway platform. As they reach an upper bedroom, through an upper bedroom window they see the SUV of a man who'd threatened to call the cops. In a panic, they jump out a window.

Deciding to back the next day, Danny and Ellie wander around the nearby town and carnival, and she starts to ask him questions. They spend the night in a pool shed, and cuddle for warmth.

In the morning, when the family of three leave, they sneak back into the house. Danny sees the girl from the platform in a photo, then gets her name, email and work address from the tabletop computer. Throwing together some food, Ellie grabs a change of clothes, he shaves, they grab a couple of bikes from the garage and head out.

Back in the city, Danny and Ellie see Vinessa go into her work, so he calls home. Darren is back, along with his associates. They are told to wait on them, but in the meantime Darren thwarts their plan by talking Vinessa into leaving her building with the briefcase. Danny intercepts her, switching their cases back.

Again calling Darren, he tries to get Danny to take the case and run, but he gives it to Ellie. She is picked up and taken to a luxious home, owned by a woman happy to finally have the art it contains. (It is a piece of art she managed to smuggle away from her recent ex-husband.) Receiving 3000 in cash, Ellie uses Danny's ID to find him and give him his cut.

Ellie heads to Port Authority to catch a bus to Philly. After a few minutes reflection, Danny grabs some things, and chases after her. Catching up to her, she tells him her ticket is to Providence, and he asks to come along.

Cast
 Callum Turner as Danny
 Grace Van Patten as Ellie
 Michal Vondel as Darren
 Mike Birbiglia as Scott
 Louis Cancelmi as Jimmy
 Margaret Colin as Evelyn
 Mariola Mlekicki as Ola
 Tashiana Washington as Monica
 Rachel Zeiger-Haag as Vinessa

Release
In September 2016, Netflix acquired worldwide distribution rights to the film.  It was released on April 21, 2017.

Critical response
 On Metacritic, which assigns a normalized rating, the film has a score 76 out of 100, based on 11 critics, indicating "generally favorable reviews".

References

External links
 
 
 

2016 films
2016 independent films
2016 romantic comedy films
2010s English-language films
American independent films
American romantic comedy films
English-language Netflix original films
Films scored by Nicholas Britell
2010s American films